Kusini is a village on the Solomon Islands. Kusini may also refer to
Kilema Kusini, a town and ward in Tanzania
Kirua Vunjo Kusini, a town and ward in Tanzania
Mamba Kusini, a town and ward in Tanzania
Machame Kusini, a town and ward in Tanzania
Masama Kusini, a town and ward in Tanzania
Mwika Kusini, a town and ward in Tanzania
Uru Kusini, a town and ward in Tanzania
Countdown at Kusini, a 1976 American action/drama film